Alwis Nanayakkara (born 9 August 1992) is a Sri Lankan cricketer. He made his first-class debut for Moors Sports Club in the 2018–19 Premier League Tournament on 25 January 2019.

References

External links
 

1992 births
Living people
Sri Lankan cricketers
Moors Sports Club cricketers
Place of birth missing (living people)